Simmondsia chinensis (jojoba) seed powder is a powder of the ground seeds of the jojoba, Simmondsia chenensis.  Simmondsia chinensis (jojoba) seed powder is commonly used in cosmetic formulations.

References

External links
International Jojoba Export Council

Cosmetics chemicals
Powders